Nasser Daineche (born 6 May 1982) is an Algerian former professional footballer who played as a defender.

Career 
On 17 May 2008, Daineche signed a one-year deal with K.S.V. Roeselare with an option for another year. He had previously played for La Louviere, Oldham Athletic, FC Istres, Le Havre AC and RFC Liège. In December 2008 he was released from his contract and became a free agent.

References

External links
 

Living people
1982 births
Association football defenders
Algerian footballers
French sportspeople of Algerian descent
Belgian Pro League players
Ligue 2 players
SO Cassis Carnoux players
R.A.A. Louviéroise players
Le Havre AC players
Oldham Athletic A.F.C. players
FC Istres players
RFC Liège players
K.S.V. Roeselare players
FC Martigues players
ÉFC Fréjus Saint-Raphaël players
Algerian expatriate sportspeople in Belgium
Algerian expatriate sportspeople in England
Algerian expatriate footballers